Trevor Castles (born 19 April 1961) is a former Australian rules footballer who played with Melbourne in the Victorian Football League (VFL).

Notes

External links 
		
DemonWiki page

1961 births
Australian rules footballers from Victoria (Australia)
Melbourne Football Club players
Living people